The 1946 Battersea North by-election was a parliamentary by-election held on 25 July 1946 for the British House of Commons constituency of Battersea North in the Metropolitan Borough of Battersea.

The seat had become vacant on the resignation from the House of Common of the constituency's Labour Member of Parliament (MP), Francis Douglas, who had been appointed as Governor of Malta and ennobled as Baron Douglas of Barloch.  He had held the seat since a by-election in 1940.

Candidates 
The Labour Party selected as its candidate Douglas Jay, a 39-year-old economist who had been a financial journalist, a Fellow of All Souls and then (from 1941) a civil servant.

The Conservative Party candidate was B.A. Shattock, while the Liberal Party did not field a candidate.

The third candidate was 38-year-old Trotskyite and adult education tutor, Hugo Dewar of the Independent Labour Party (ILP). He had joined the ILP in 1928, and in 1929 co-founded the Marxian League. He joined the Communist Party of Great Britain in 1931, but was expelled the following year. He was one of the founders in 1932 of the Communist League, Britain's first 'official' Trotskyist group, and had remained active in 'Left Opposition' groups until he was drafted into the army in 1943.

Results 
On a turnout reduced to 55% from the 71% at the 1945 general election, Jay held the seat for Labour with 69% of votes, a small reduction from the 74% won by his predecessor in 1945. Shattock's 29.6% share was a small increase on the 26.1% Conservative vote the previous year, while Dewar won only 240 votes (1.5%) of the total, and lost his deposit.

Aftermath 
Jay joined the government the following year as Economic Secretary to the Treasury, and held several other government offices before his retirement from the House of Commons in 1983. He was made a life peer in 1987.

Votes

See also
 Battersea North constituency
 1940 Battersea North by-election
 Battersea
 List of United Kingdom by-elections
 United Kingdom by-election records

References

Sources 
 
 

Battersea North by-election
Battersea North,1946
Battersea North by-election
Battersea North,1946
Battersea
Battersea North by-election